Metropolitan Elia (secular name Matti Veli Juhani Wallgrén; born 8 December 1961) is the current metropolitan of Oulu of the Finnish Orthodox Church. He was consecrated on 11 January 2015. He follows in this position Metropolitan Panteleimon, who retired in June 2013. His home church is the Holy Trinity Cathedral of Oulu.

Background
Matti Wallgrén’s mother was Orthodox. His father only joined the church in his old age.

Studies
Wallgrén matriculated in the town of Kajaani. After this he studied at Stockholm University, his subjects being Swedish and Czech languages and phonetics. He also studied pedagogy and became a teacher for a comprehensive school in Stockholm. He lived in Sweden for eight years. He also lived in the Czech Republic for two years, working as a guide.

Wallgrén joined the Orthodox church in Helsinki in 1994. In 1996, he started his studies in theology in University of Joensuu, where he studied for five years. He also sang in the church choir and acted as reader in services.

In 2001 he transferred to the Saint Vladimir's Orthodox Theological Seminary in Crestwood, New York. He completed the degree of Master of Divinity there.

Career as a priest
Metropolitan Ambrosius ordained Wallgrén a deacon in the St. Herman of Alaska Church in Espoo on 29 May 2003.

Archbishop Leo ordained Wallgrén a priest in Jyväskylä on 1 September 2003, after which he was assigned to that church.

During 2003–2006 Wallgrén served as a priest in the Jyväskylä Orthodox Parish, and during 2006–2014 he worked as the vicar of the Vaasa Orthodox Parish. Wallgrén was the only priest of his vast parish, and he has said that he drove 45,000 km every year.

Election to bishop
Wallgrén was elected the new metropolitan of Oulu in New Valamo in a church council in November 2014. He was a surprise candidate and was not present himself in the election. The church council selected three persons as candidates, and the council of bishops chose two of them for the final election. In the final election, Wallgrén received 17 votes and Vicar Bishop Arseni (Heikkinen) received 16 votes. One delegate left an empty ballot.

The election caused some polemics afterwards. The church council had no information on Wallgrén prior to the election, not even a curriculum vitae, even though it was said that Wallgrén had given his consent to his candidacy two weeks prior to the election. It was also said that in practice the delegates from the Helsinki Diocese elected the new bishop, since the other two dioceses have so few delegates that they would not form a majority. Archbishop Leo complained that the new bishop came as if from “behind a tree”.

The igumen of the New Valamo monastery, Archimandrite Sergei tonsured Wallgrén a monk, with the name of Elia, in honour of Prophet Elia of Tisbe. The following day in Valamo, he was elevated to the rank of archimandrite by Metropolitan Panteleimon.

Elia was consecrated a bishop in Oulu on 11 January 2015. The consecration was by Archbishop Leo, and he was assisted by the other four Finnish bishops.

In January 2015, Metropolitan Elia travelled to Constantinople, where Archbishop Leo introduced him to Patriarch Bartholomew.

Metropolitan Elia speaks many languages. Among them are Swedish, Czech, Polish, English, German, and some Russian.

References

See also 
 Orthodoxy
 Bishop
 Metropolitan Bishop
 Metropolitan of Oulu

Eastern Orthodox metropolitans
Bishops of the Orthodox Church of Finland
1961 births
Living people
Eastern Orthodox bishops in Europe